Phiditiidae is a family of moths. The family used to be placed as a subfamily (Phiditiinae) in the family Bombycidae.

Diversity
The family consists of 4 genera and about 25 species.

Genera
Phiditia Möschler, 1883
Rolepa Walker, 1855
Sorocaba Moore, 1882
Tepilia Walker, 1855

References

Bombycoidea
Moth families